Laila Suzigan Abate (born 2 August 2000) is a Brazilian Paralympic swimmer who competes in international swimming competitions. She is a Paralympic bronze medalist and a double Parapan American Games champion.

Personal life
Suzigan was diagnosed with hereditary spastic paraparesis, a rare and progressive disability, as a result, she struggles walking short distances and is mainly wheelchair dependent.

References

2000 births
Living people
People from Uberlândia
Paralympic swimmers of Brazil
Medalists at the World Para Swimming Championships
Medalists at the 2019 Parapan American Games
Swimmers at the 2020 Summer Paralympics
Medalists at the 2020 Summer Paralympics
S6-classified Paralympic swimmers
Sportspeople from Minas Gerais